Port of Miami is the debut studio album by American rapper Rick Ross. Originally titled Career Criminal, the album was renamed, in reference to Miami being a major arrival destination for cocaine shipments to America. The album was released August 8, 2006, on Slip-n-Slide Records, Def Jam Recordings and Poe Boy Entertainment. The album was engineered by Miami-based songwriting and production team The Monsters & The Strangerz. The album debuted at number one on the US Billboard 200, with 187,000 copies sold in its first week.

The album's first single, "Hustlin' ", received an exorbitant amount of airplay. The remix version features Jay-Z and Young Jeezy. The album's second single, "Push It", produced by J. R. Rotem. This track samples the song "Push It to the Limit" from the movie Scarface. Port of Miami was certified gold by the Recording Industry Association of America on November 8, 2006, with over 500,000 copies. According to Soundscan, the album has sold 857,000 copies to date. It was later certified Platinum by the RIAA In July 2016.

Critical reception

Port of Miami was met with generally favorable reviews from music critics. Michael Endelman of Entertainment Weekly said, "On Port of Miami, Ross turns the minute details of drug distribution and dealing into ominous, slow-rolling songs, like the hypnotic, organ-driven hit single "Hustlin'" and the Scarface-goes-South Beach stomp of ”Cross That Line.” In general, the whole "crack-rap" trend (see: Young Jeezy, Clipse) is a disheartening one, but Ross’ pulpy debut manages to enthrall despite the drug-centric lyrics." Sam Ubl of Pitchfork Media said, "Port of Miami is a case of invention begetting necessity. Sure Ross needs these beats—he has all the charisma of a cold meatloaf. But they need him all the same. He's a supporting actor, second fiddle to the real, Pro-Tooled stars, desirable not for his authority or presence but for his utter blankness. Def Jam could heli-drop any bozo into such glorious ambiance and score some hits; the album facilitates sedentariness." Jonathan Ringen of Rolling Stone said, "Ross' minimal, menacing rhymes about being a drug-game kingpin feel a little undercooked, but with synth-soaked ring-tone-ready beats that are hotter than the "MI-Yayo" in the summertime (mostly by local beatmakers Cool and Dre, DJ Khaled and the Runners), it doesn't really matter." Brendan Frederick of XXL said, "While the runaway success of "Hustlin'" could have positioned Ross for one-hit-wonder status, he confidently sidesteps this fate by delivering the goods on Port of Miami. With a cohesive sound the city can call its own, the bearded rapper gets the release he needs by exposing the dark side of the Sunshine State."

Commercial performance
Port of Miami debuted at number one on the US Billboard 200, selling 187,000 copies sold in its first week. In its second week, the album fell to number seven on the chart, selling 79,000 copies. As of July 2013, the album has sold 857,000 copies in the US. On July 28, 2016, the album was certified platinum by the Recording Industry Association of America (RIAA) for sales of over a million copies in the United States.

Track listing 

Sample credits
 "Push It" contains a sample of "Scarface (Push It to the Limit)" performed by Paul Engemann.
 "I'm Bad" contains a sample of "Theme From S.W.A.T." performed by Rhythm Heritage.
 "Get Away" contains a sample of "Sometimes I Rhyme Slow" performed by Nice & Smooth.
 "Hit U From the Back" contains a sample of "Savoir Faire" performed by Chic.
 "Street Life" contains a sample of "Afterimage" performed by Rush.

Charts

Weekly charts

Year-end charts

Certifications

References

Rick Ross albums
2006 debut albums
Def Jam Recordings albums
Albums produced by Akon
Albums produced by the Runners
Albums produced by J. R. Rotem
Albums produced by Jazze Pha
Albums produced by Cool & Dre
Albums produced by DJ Toomp
Albums produced by Big Reese
Albums produced by DJ Khaled